Klaus Töpfer (born 29 July 1938) is a German politician (CDU) and environmental politics expert. From 1998 to 2006 he was executive director of the United Nations Environment Programme (UNEP).

Early life and education 
Töpfer was born in Waldenburg, Silesia. He studied economics in Mainz, Frankfurt and Münster. In 1968 he earned his doctorate at the University of Münster.

Early career 
In 1971, Töpfer was appointed Head of Planning and Information of the Federal State of Saarland, a post he held until 1978. During that time, he also served as a visiting professor at the Academy of Administrative Sciences in Speyer, and consulted several countries on development policy, among them Egypt, Brazil and Jordan. He spent the following year at the University of Hannover as Professor and Director of the Institute for Spatial Research and Planning.

Political career 
In 1985 Töpfer became State Minister for the Environment and Health in the government of Minister President Bernhard Vogel of Rhineland-Palatinate.

In 1987 Töpfer became Federal Minister for the Environment, Nature Conservation and Nuclear Safety under Chancellor Helmut Kohl. During his time in office, Germany established the Federal Office for Radiation Protection as a response to the Chernobyl disaster. From 1994 to 1998 he served as Federal Minister for Regional Planning, Civil Engineering and Urban Development. He was member of the Bundestag from 1990 to 1998 and member of the Steering Committee of the CDU from 1992 to 1998.

In 1998 Töpfer was appointed Under Secretary General of the United Nations, General director of the United Nations office in Nairobi and Executive Director of the United Nations Environment Programme. Among the milestones of his eight-year tenure are a number of important environmental agreements, including the Cartagena Protocol on Biosafety and the Stockholm Convention on Persistent Organic Pollutants. Töpfer was also closely involved in behind-the-scenes negotiations in support of the Kyoto Protocol on climate change. In June 2006 he was succeeded in this office by Achim Steiner. As director of UNEP, he has had a key role in gauging and attempting to remedy the environmental costs of the 2004 Asian tsunami.

Later career 
In 2009 Töpfer was appointed founding director of the Institute for Advanced Sustainability Studies (IASS) which performs research between climate problems and sustainable economics. This institute is located at Potsdam, Germany. The institutes funding is provided by the federal government of Germany Federal Ministry of Education and Research (Germany).

Töpfer was rumored as a possible successor to the German presidency after Christian Wulff's resignation. He later served as co-chairman of the Federal Government’s Ethics Commission on a Safe Energy Supply.

Since 2013 Töpfer has been heading the project "DEMOENERGY – The Transformation of the Energy System as the Engine for Democratic Innovations" together with Claus Leggewie and Patrizia Nanz (both Institute for Advanced Study in the Humanities Essen, Germany). In 2016, the United Nations Economic and Social Council (ECOSOC) appointed Töpfer as co-chairman (alongside Juan Somavia) of an Independent Team of Advisors on positioning the UN development system for the Sustainable Development Goals.

In 2018, Energy Community appointed Töpfer to serve as mediator in an energy dispute between Kosovo and Serbia.

Other activities

Corporate boards
 Theva, Member of the Senior Advisory Council (since 2017)
 Porsche, Member of the Sustainability Advisory Board (since 2016)
 ProSiebenSat.1 Media, Member of the Advisory Board (since 2011)
 Deutsche Bank, Member of the Climate Change Advisory Board (2011)
 Volkswind Gruppe, Member of the Advisory Board (2009–2015)

Non-profit organizations
 atmosfair, Patron
 Stiftung Zukunftsfähigkeit, Member of the Advisory Board
 Helmholtz Association of German Research Centres, Member of the Senate (2007–2009)
 Institute for Energy Efficiency in Production (EEP), University of Stuttgart, Member of the Advisory Board
 German Foundation for World Population (DSW), Member of the Advisory Board 
 German-Russian Raw Materials Forum, Patron
 Holcim Foundation for Sustainable Construction, Member of the Board 
 Agora Energiewende, Chairman of the Council (2013–2018)
 German Council for Sustainable Development (RNE), Member (2001–2010, appointed ad personam by Chancellor Gerhard Schröder)

References

External links 

https://archive.today/20130416041104/http://www.unep.org/Documents/Default.asp?DocumentID=43&ArticleID=3174
https://web.archive.org/web/20110524114350/http://www.gleeds.tv/index.cfm?video=99
https://www.iass-potsdam.de/en/people/klaus-topfer

1938 births
Living people
People from Wałbrzych
Environment ministers of Germany
Club of Rome members
Christian Democratic Union of Germany politicians
Members of the Bundestag for Saarland
Members of the Bundestag 1994–1998
German officials of the United Nations
People from the Province of Lower Silesia
United Nations Environment Programme
Grand Crosses with Star and Sash of the Order of Merit of the Federal Republic of Germany
People from Freiberg
Members of the European Academy of Sciences and Arts
State ministers of Rhineland-Palatinate